"Muñecas" (English: "Dolls") is a song by Argentine singer Tini, Argentine rapper La Joaqui and American music producer Steve Aoki. The song was released on 12 January 2023, through Hollywood Records and 5020 Records as the ninght single from Tini's fourth studio album, Cupido (2023).

Background and release 
On 29 December 2022, Tini posted on her Instagram reel, a video with a snippet of the song, revealing the name and how it is a collaboration with Joaqui and Aoki. On 9 January 2023,  she shared some pictures from the shoot and revealed how the song is coming out on 12 January 2023. A few days before the song's release, Tini shared a #MuñecasChallenge, which quickly went viral on the video sharing platform TikTok. In interview with Rolling Stone, Tini shared that Aoki sent her the song during the pandemic and they decided to save it. Once the track was finalized, she thought her compatriot La Joaqui would be the best person to sing the track with. She also added: “Ever since I heard ‘Muñecas’ for the first time, I always imagined singing it next to a woman. I started listening to music by La Joaqui and instantly thought of her for it.” [...] “She is a woman with so much strength and values, a great artist and person. I hope life unites us many more times for collaborations.” Aoki also speak up abouth collaboration saying: “It was a great experience working with Tini and La Joaqui because we were able to merge our individual musical styles, and come together for this track.”

Composition 
The lyrics fort the song were written by the three singers, alongside Andrés Torres, Mauricio Rengifo, Osman Escobar, Elena Rose, Rafael Rodríguez, Steve Salazar, David Orea, Juan José Arias, Santiago Naranjo Lopez, Juan David Correa Cardona and Donny Flores, while Aoki, Torres and Rengifo, also served as producers of the song along with Oplus. Musically, the song blended the cumbia beats that Tini is known for with an  electronic edge. Aoki also describes “Muñecas” as a song “bursting with flavor and rhythm, mixing tradition with innovation.” The lyrics contain references how girls living their best lives on the dance floor, while also doubles as a fierce club banger and a girl power anthem. The song lasts for a duration of two minutes thirty-six seconds. It is written in the key of A Minor, with a moderately fast tempo of 150 beats per minute.

Music video 
The video for "Muñecas" was directed by Tini's long-time collaborator Diego Peskins and has featured an unparalleled celebration that includes a shower of champagne. In the music video, Tini brings the “Muñecas” fantasy to life. The two artists are shown living large inside a lavish dollhouse where they are serving fierce looks in every room, and singing from inside different rooms of what seems to be the pair’s dollhouse.  Tini translates the sensuality of her song into moves. Aoki also appears in the briefly in Tini’s extravagant, vibrant video.

Credits and personnel 
Adapted from Tidal.

 Tini – lead vocals, songwriting
 Steve Aoki – co-lead vocals, songwriting, production
 La Joaqui – co-lead vocals, songwriting
 Andrés Torres – songwriting, production, programming, instruments, engineering
 Mauricio Rengifo – songwriting, production, programming, instruments, engineering
 Osman Escobar – songwriting
 Elena Rose – songwriting
 Rafael Rodríguez – songwriting
 Steve Salazar – songwriting
 David Orea – songwriting
 Juan José Arias – songwriting
 Santiago Naranjo Lopez – songwriting
 Juan David Correa Cardona – songwriting
 Donny Flores – songwriting
 Oplus – production, programming
 Dani Val – engineering
 Luigi Navarro – engineering
 The Elephant – engineering, mixing

Charts

Monthly charts

References 

2023 singles
2023 songs
Tini (singer) songs
Steve Aoki songs
Songs written by Steve Aoki
Songs written by Elena Rose
Songs written by Andrés Torres (producer)
Songs written by Mauricio Rengifo
Song recordings produced by Andrés Torres (producer)
Hollywood Records singles
Cumbia songs
Latin music songs
Electronic dance music songs
Songs with feminist themes
Spanish-language songs